The Orange City Town Hall is a historic site in Orange City, Florida, United States. It is located at 205 East Graves Avenue. On May 16, 2002, it was added to the U.S. National Register of Historic Places.

References

External links

 Volusia County listings at National Register of Historic Places
 Orange City Town Hall at Florida's Office of Cultural and Historical Programs

City and town halls in Florida
National Register of Historic Places in Volusia County, Florida
Clock towers in Florida
Orange City, Florida
City and town halls on the National Register of Historic Places in Florida